West Belconnen Warriors Rugby League Club is an Australian rugby league football club based in Belconnen, Australian Capital Territory formed in the mid 1970s. They conduct teams for both junior and senior teams.

Notable Juniors
Bradley Clyde (1988-00 Canberra Raiders & Canterbury Bulldogs)
Troy Thompson (2001-11 Canberra Raiders & Melbourne Storm)
Nick Kouparitsas (2006-11 Canterbury Bulldogs, Sydney Roosters & London Broncos)
Brent Crisp (2008 Canterbury Bulldogs)
Matt Frawley (2017- Canterbury Bulldogs)
Bailey Simonsson (2019- Canberra Raiders)

References

External links

Sporting clubs in Canberra
Rugby league teams in the Australian Capital Territory
Rugby clubs established in 1975
1975 establishments in Australia